Gay  (alternatively Gaye) is a male or female given name, the 795th ("Gay") and 1295th ("Gaye") most common female name in the United States, according to the 1990 U.S. census. 

It can also be used as a short form of the female names Gaynell and Gaynor and as a short form of the male names Gaylen,  Gabriel  and Gaylord. 

The writer Gay Talese's name is derived from Gaetano, his grandfather's name.

The first name of the popular male Irish television presenter Gabriel Byrne was always abbreviated as "Gay", as in the title of his radio show The Gay Byrne Show.

People with the given name Gay
Gay Allison (born 1953), Canadian poet, editor, and English teacher
Gay Assulin (born 1991), Israeli professional footballer
Gay Autterson (born 1943), American voice actress
Elgin Gay Baylor (1934–2021), American basketball player, coach, executive
Martin Gay Black (1786–1861), son of the founder of the Methodist congregation in Nova Scotia
Gay Block (born 1942), fine art portrait photographer from Texas
Will Gay Bottje (1925–2018), American composer known for electronic music
Michael Gay Bourke (born 1941), Bishop of Wolverhampton from 1993 until 2007
Gay Brewer (1932–2007), American professional golfer
William Gay Brown Jr. (1856–1916), lawyer, and Democratic politician from West Virginia
Gay Bryan (born 1927), American long and triple jumper
Gay Byrne (1934-2019), Irish presenter and host of radio and television
Gay Caswell (born 1948), writer and political figure in Saskatchewan, Canada
Frank Gay Clarke (1850–1901), American politician, lawyer, and a United States Representative
Gay Courter (born 1944), American film writer, author, and novelist
Gay Crusader (1914–1932), British thoroughbred racehorse
Gay Hamilton (born 1943), Scottish actress
Lisa Gay Hamilton (born 1964), American actress in films, television & stage
Marcia Gay Harden (born 1959), American actress
Gay Hendricks (born 1945), American author and psychologist
Gay Jacobsen D'Asaro (born 1954), American Olympic foil fencer
Gay Kayler (born 1941), Australian country music entertainer, recording artist and singer
Gay Kernan (born 1947), American politician, Republican member of the New Mexico Senate
Gay Kindersley (1930–2011), British champion amateur jump jockey and horse trainer
Gay Mandeville (1894–1969), the first native-born Bishop of Barbados
Martha Gay Masterson (1837–1916), American settler who kept a diary throughout her life
Gay McDougall (born 1947), American human rights activist
Gay McManus (born 1958), Irish Gaelic footballer 
Gay Mecene (1975–1998), American-bred, French-trained thoroughbred racehorse and sire
Gay Mitchell (born 1951), Irish Fine Gael politician
Gay Mitchell (Gaelic footballer) (born 1948), Irish sportsperson
Gay O'Carroll (born 1964), Irish footballer
Gay O'Driscoll (born 1946), Irish retired Gaelic footballer
Gay Outlaw (born 1959), American sculptor, photographer and printmaker
James Gay Sawkins (1806–1878), British geologist and artist
Mary Gay Scanlon (born 1959), American attorney and politician
Gay Seabrook (1901–1970), American actress
Gay Search, British horticulturalist
Gaye Symington (born 1954), Speaker of the Vermont House of Representatives
Gay Talese (born 1932), American author
Gay Thompson (born 1948), Australian Labor member of parliament
Gay-Yee Westerhoff (born 1973), the Chinese-English cellist
Marion Gay Wofford (1922–2013), American politician
Gay Woods (born 1948), Irish musician and singer
Víctor Gay Zaragoza (born 1982), writer, consultant on storytelling

References

See also
Gai (disambiguation)
Gaye (disambiguation)
Guy (given name)
Gay (nickname)
Gay (surname)

English-language unisex given names